Jostein Gaarder (born 8 August 1952) is a Norwegian intellectual and author of several novels, short stories, and children's books. Gaarder often writes from the perspective of children, exploring their sense of wonder about the world. He often utilizes metafiction in his works and constructs stories within stories. His best known work is the novel Sophie's World: A Novel About the History of Philosophy (1991). It has been translated into 60 languages; there are over 40 million copies in print.

Family
Gaarder was born and raised in Oslo.  His father was a school headmaster and his mother was a teacher and author of children’s books. Gaarder married Siri Dannevig in Oslo in 1974. They moved to Bergen, Norway in 1979 and had two sons.

In 1997, Gaarder and Siri Dannevig established the Sophie Prize. It was an environmental development prize of (USD 100,000 = 77,000 €), awarded annually until 2013, when it was announced that it would no longer be awarded due to lack of funds.  It was named after the novel.

Education
Gaarder attended Oslo Cathedral School and the University of Oslo, where he studied Scandinavian languages and theology. After graduation in 1976, he was a high school teacher in Bergen, Norway, prior to his literary career.

Awards and prizes
1990 - Norwegian Critics Prize for Literature for the year's best children's or youth's literature, for Kabalmysteriet (The Solitaire Mystery)
1993 – Norwegian Booksellers' Prize for I et speil, i en gåte (Through a Glass, Darkly).
1994 – Deutscher Jugendliteraturpreis for Sophie's World.
1995 – Premio Bancarella for Il Mondo di Sofia, the Italian translation of Sophie's World.<ref>{{cite web |title=Albo d'Oro |url=http://www.premiobancarella.info/bancarella/albo.php |publisher=Premio Bancarella |access-date=2010-10-08|language=it}}</ref>
1996 - Peer Gynt Prize
1997 – Buxtehude Bull for Durch einen Spiegel, in einem dunklen Wort, the German translation of I et speil, i en gåte.
2004 – the Willy-Brandt Award in Oslo.
2005 – Commander, The Royal Norwegian Order of St. Olav.
2005 – an Honorary degree at Trinity College, Dublin.

Environmental activism
Gaarder has been involved in the promotion of sustainable development for nearly two decades. He established the Sophie Prize in 1997, an international award bestowed on foundations and individuals concerned with the environment. Through the Sophie Prize, Gaarder contributed over $1.5 million to worthy environmental causes. The final Sophie Prize was awarded in October 2013 to Bill McKibben.

Political advocacy and religious controversy

Jostein Gaarder is active politically. The focus of his concern is the plight of Palestinian refugees, and he has vehemently criticized the Israeli occupation of the West Bank. In August 2006, Gaarder wrote a controversial op-ed titled "God's Chosen People" that was published in the largest daily newspaper in Norway, Aftenposten.Gaarder, Jostein. "God's Chosen People " Retrieved on 2006-08-25 Gaarder wrote it in response to the 2006 Israel-Lebanon conflict. He argued in favor of "recognizing the State of Israel of 1948, but not the one of 1967".

"God's Chosen People" had a broader scope than conflicting territorial claims. Gaarder described Judaism as "an archaic national and warlike religion", contrasting it with the Christian idea that the "Kingdom of God is compassion and forgiveness". Gaarder disputed allegations of anti-Semitism.

List of worksDiagnosen og andre noveller (The Diagnosis and Other Stories) (1986)Froskeslottet (The Frog Castle) (1988)Kabalmysteriet (The Solitaire Mystery) (1990) Sofies verden (Sophie's World) (1991) Julemysteriet (The Christmas Mystery) (1992)  (1995 edition illustrated by Stella East )Bibbi Bokkens magiske bibliotek (Bibbi Bokken's magic library) (together with Klaus Hagerup(1993) I et speil, i en gåte (Through a Glass, Darkly) (1993) Hallo? Er det noen her? (Hello? Is Anybody There?) (1996) Vita Brevis: A Letter to St Augustine (Also published in English as That Same Flower) (1998) Maya (1999)  Sirkusdirektørens datter (The Ringmaster's Daughter) (2001) Appelsinpiken (The Orange Girl) (2004) Sjakk Matt (Checkmate) (2006)De gule dvergene (The Yellow Dwarves) (2006)Slottet i Pyreneene (The Castle in the Pyrenees) (2008)Det spørs (2012) Anna. En fabel om klodens klima og miljø (" Anna. A fable about the earth's climate and environment") (2013)Anton og Jonatan (Anton and Jonatan) (2014) Dukkeføreren'' (2016)

References

External links

 Jostein Gaarder's biography and foreign sales at Aschehoug Agency
 The world of Jostein  – Il Mondo di Jostein: Sito italiano dedicato a Jostein Gaarder
 The Sophie Prize  – established by Gaarder in 1997
 A list of all his books and publishers
 Commentary on the book: Sophie's World
 Jostein Gaarder in Goodreads
 

20th-century Norwegian novelists
21st-century Norwegian novelists
Norwegian male short story writers
Norwegian children's writers
Critics of Judaism
Writers from Oslo
1952 births
Living people
Bancarella Prize winners
University of Oslo alumni
People educated at Oslo Cathedral School
20th-century Norwegian short story writers
21st-century Norwegian short story writers